The Salmon Brook Historical Society is the local historical society of Granby, Connecticut.  The society's museum property is located and 208 Salmon Brook Street, and includes four historic buildings, which include museum displays of historic items, and a small research library.  Two of the buildings, the Rowe and Weed Houses, are listed as a pair on the National Register of Historic Places.

Abijah Rowe House
The Abijah Rowe House stands on the west side of the property, facing west toward Salmon Brook Street.  It is a -story wood-frame structure, with a side-gable roof, central chimney, and clapboarded exterior.  Its facade is five bays wide, with a center entrance framed by narrow moulding and a frieze with triglyphs topped by a shallow cornice.  The interior retains many original period finishes, and has been decorated to have an early 1800s appearance.  The house was built about 1732, probably by Nehemiah Lee, and is the oldest surviving building of the first colonial settlement of the area.

Moses Weed House
The Moses Weed House stands behind the Rowe House, to which it is connected by a short hyphen; it faces north toward Meadow Gate Road.  It is a single-story wood-frame structure, with a side-gable roof and central chimney. Its main facade is three bays wide, with a central entrance framed by simple trim.  The interior includes a parlor finished in Victorian style, as well as the society's library and shop.  The house was built in the uplands of Granby about 1790, and was moved here in 1970 to rescue it from demolition.

Cooley School
The Cooley School is a single-story wood-frame structure with a gabled roof.  Built about 1870, it is the only unaltered district schoolhouse remaining in Granby.  It served as a school until 1972, and was moved by the society to its property in 1980.  Its interior has been fitted as a late 19th-century classroom.

Tobacco Barn
Also on the property stands a 1914 tobacco barn, which now houses a variety of exhibits on Granby's history and agrarian past.

See also
National Register of Historic Places listings in Hartford County, Connecticut

References

See also
Salmon Brook Historical Society web site

Houses on the National Register of Historic Places in Connecticut
National Register of Historic Places in Hartford County, Connecticut
Houses completed in 1732
Museums in Hartford County, Connecticut
Historic house museums in Connecticut